Sam Allen (January 30, 1909 – April 1963) was an American jazz pianist.

Early life
Allen was born in Middleport, Ohio. Beginning at the age of 10, he accompanied silent films on piano in movie theaters.

Career 
In 1928, Allen moved to New York City, where he joined Herbert Cowans's band at the Rockland Palace. Before long, he moved back to Ohio, where he played with saxophonist Alex Jackson in 1930. He joined James P. Johnson's orchestra as the second pianist and then was a member of the Teddy Hill band. In the 1940s he worked with Stuff Smith, Dizzy Gillespie, and became pianist for Slim & Slam.

Discography

With Dizzy Gillespie
 The Complete RCA Victor Recordings (Bluebird, 1995)

References

1909 births
1963 deaths
American jazz pianists
American male pianists
20th-century American pianists
Jazz musicians from Ohio
20th-century American male musicians
American male jazz musicians
Slim & Slam members
People from Middleport, Ohio